AKM Semiconductor, Inc. (AKMS) is a semiconductor manufacturer headquartered in San Jose, California. It is subsidiary of Asahi Kasei Microdevices (AKM) based in  Tokyo, Japan.   

AKM Semiconductor, Inc. was founded under AKM, which is one of the core operating groups under the umbrella company, Asahi Kasei Corporation electronics business group (Tokyo Stock Exchange (3407.T). AKMS comprises the devices and electronic materials sector of the AKM group.

Products

AKMS manufactures mixed-signal IC’s and devices utilized in video processing, mobile communications, and optical networking for the consumer, personal communications, and automotive markets. 

Some applications of AKM’s chips are as components in DVD players, digital mixers, digital audio workstations, and other digital audio applications. Their products include codecs, audio DACs, low-power audio for portable devices, ADCs, DVD-Audio, stereo and multichannel sound, DSD, and S/PDIF transmitters and receivers.

Product Categories
Audio Products
Video Products
Electronic Compass
Mobile Communication Products

Incidents 
On 20 October 2020, a fire broke out at the company's Nobeoka semiconductor fabrication plant, lasting 3 days and impacting the high-end audio industry.

References

External links 
 Official AKM Semiconductor website
 List of AKM Part Datasheets

Electronics companies of Japan
Manufacturing companies based in California
Semiconductor companies of the United States
Technology companies based in the San Francisco Bay Area
Companies based in San Jose, California